Alec Pierce (born May 2, 2000) is an American football wide receiver for the Indianapolis Colts of the National Football League (NFL). He played college football at Cincinnati before the Colts drafted him in the 2nd round of the 2022 NFL Draft.

Early life and high school
Pierce grew up in Glen Ellyn, Illinois and attended Glenbard West High School, where he played football, volleyball, basketball and ran track. As a senior, he caught 25 passes for 372 yards and five touchdowns with three sacks and four interceptions on defense and was named the Most Valuable Player of the West Suburban Conference Silver Division. Pierce was rated a three-star recruit and committed to play college football at Cincinnati over scholarship offers from 16 other programs.

College career
Pierce played mostly on special teams as a true freshman. He practiced at linebacker ahead of the team's appearance in the Military Bowl but ultimately did not play at that position. As a sophomore Pierce caught 37 passes for a team-high 652 yards and two touchdowns. He missed four games of his junior season due to a knee injury and finished the year with 17 receptions for 315 yards and three touchdowns. As a senior, Pierce caught 52 passes for 884 yards and eight touchdowns and was named second-team All-American Athletic Conference.

Statistics

Professional career

Pierce was drafted by the Indianapolis Colts in the second round with the 53rd overall pick in the 2022 NFL Draft. On October 16, Pierce caught his first career touchdown in the Week 6 matchup against the Jacksonville Jaguars. The Colts won the game 34-27. He finished his rookie season with 41 receptions for 593 receiving yards and two receiving touchdowns.

References

Additional reading

 Andrew Moore, "Alec Pierce: Indianapolis Colts Rookie Files," Horseshoe Huddle, August 30, 2022.

External links
 Indianapolis Colts bio
 Cincinnati Bearcats bio

American football wide receivers
Cincinnati Bearcats football players
Players of American football from Illinois
Living people
People from Glen Ellyn, Illinois
Sportspeople from DuPage County, Illinois
2000 births
Indianapolis Colts players